Walter Campbell Shoup (June 5, 1872 – October 30, 1945) was an American attorney, politician, college football coach, and army serviceman.

Early life
Shoup was the son of United States Senator George L. Shoup. He attended Yale Law School, graduating in 1893.

Football coaching
Shoup served as the head football coach at the University of Utah in 1895, compiling a record of 0–1.

Politics
In 1888, Shoup was a private secretary to the Governor of Idaho. In 1908, he served a term in the Idaho State Senate.

Military service
Shoup was an army serviceman in the Spanish–American War.

Head coaching record

References

External links
 

1872 births
1945 deaths
American lawyers
Idaho Republicans
Utah Utes football coaches
Yale Law School alumni
American military personnel of the Spanish–American War
People from Salmon, Idaho
Coaches of American football from Idaho
Burials at Arlington National Cemetery